Return to Zork is a 1993 graphic adventure game in the Zork series. It was developed by Activision and was the final Zork game to be published under the Infocom label.

Gameplay
Unlike the previous games in the Zork franchise, which were text adventures, Return to Zork takes place from a first-person perspective and makes use of video-captured actors as well as detailed graphics and a musical score; a point-and-click interface replaced the text parser for the first time in a Zork game. The overall gameplay style was somewhat similar to Myst, although Return to Zork predated Myst by a few months. Unlike Myst, which had no extraspatial dimensions of functionality, Return to Zork features multiple ways of interacting with each object in the game world, as well as with several non-player characters also present in the world via a menu which appears on the left side of the screen. It also offers multiple ways to "complete" the game.

It is possible to kill several of the game's civilian non-player characters, whereas in every other Infocom or Zork game, such actions are either impossible to accomplish or immediately punished by death. Killing causes a masked vigilante who is also the "Guardian" to come and remove all the player's items, with the intention of rendering the game unwinnable. As in the Zork text-adventure games, there are several ways to make the game unwinnable by using or altering an object or item in an unintended manner.

Game bugs make some of the puzzles harder, or more specifically, stop the game from providing hints. A patch was released that fixed these bugs. However the patch also introduced a new bug that made an inventory item disappear, rendering an endgame challenge unsolvable by its intended solution, though alternate solutions exist.

Development
Return to Zork was a key part of Activision's attempt to revive the company, overseen by new president Bobby Kotick. Purchasing the company with his business associates, Kotick "fired all 200 employees and implemented a bankruptcy reorganization plan", according to Jeff Sengstack of NewMedia. The goal was to capitalize on Activision's lucrative back catalog of licenses, chief among them Zork. Kotick noted in 1996 that "Zork on a brick would sell 100,000 copies".

Among the actors who appear in the game were a number of recognizable character actors as well as a number of well-known younger actors: Robyn Lively of Twin Peaks as "The Fairy", Jason Hervey of The Wonder Years as "The Troll King", Sam J. Jones from the 1980 film Flash Gordon as "The Blind Bowman", and A.J. Langer of My So-Called Life as fellow Zork explorer Rebecca Snoot.

Game designer Doug Barnett worked independently with Activision and wrote several "choose your own adventure" style books. Writer Michele Em developed game scenarios and the characters' dialogue. Art designer Mark Long (co-founder/owner of Zombie Studios) had several goals in mind to "make the game realistic" and "avoid things like mazes in text adventure games," and "multiple ways to solve puzzles, and to finish the game." In an interview in 1999, he stated these concepts:

 All of the puzzles in the game reference real, albeit esoteric, references to various cultures and archeological history and studies. A common example would be the exploration of the pyramids in Egypt along with the mythology that surrounds them, but uncommonly known examples were chosen over better-known ones. Mark's overseas duties in the U.S. Army (retired Major) combined with a year of historical research enhanced the puzzles that must be solved to finish the game.
 Navigation is "always correct; if you move north then south, you are always in the same place. Solving mazes was overdone, dull, and annoying."
 There are multiple ("at least three") ways to solve puzzles, as well "as a half-dozen ways to complete the game." His reasoning: "I didn't like games that you had to follow a single, specific, obfuscated path for each puzzle, and just one way the game could be finished." This was contrary to text-based adventure games and the widely popular Myst series. It also "gave the player a reason to play the game more than once, trying to discover new ways to solve puzzles and to finish the game. Serious gamers said they had worked out dozens of combinations to complete the game."

Plot
Return to Zork is set in the year 1647 GUE, later than any other game in the fictitious history of Zork, including those made after it. Even the relevant backstory postdates all other games, beginning with the Great Diffusion in 1247 GUE. The events of earlier games and even the Great Diffusion, to a degree, have come to be regarded as archaeology or even mythology by this time. Some locations and items place 1647 - such as a club for viewing stand-up comedy performances - as contemporaneous, or at least similar, to the late 20th century.

The player's character is a sweepstakes winner who wins an all expenses paid holiday to the Valley of the Sparrows, in Zork.  Upon arrival, however, the player quickly learns that the entire area has fallen under some dark and sinister influence, becoming decayed and dysfunctional.  Whole buildings have mysteriously vanished, murderous vultures infest the land, people have frequent and disturbing nightmares featuring some dark being which refers to itself as Morphius, and many of those who have survived have become reclusive and paranoid. The player must survive countless perils whilst exploring the valley, investigating the causes of the powers that have gripped the land and ultimately putting a stop to them.

Release
Roughly half a year before Return to Zorks original release on PC, Activision announced that the game would also be released for the 3DO Interactive Multiplayer. This version was later cancelled. Two months later after release, it was announced that Activision was working on a conversion of Return to Zork for the Atari Jaguar after they were signed by Atari Corporation to be a third-party developer for the system. The port was then announced in video game magazines in 1994 as one of the first upcoming titles for the Atari Jaguar CD add-on. It was kept being advertised as in development on magazines in 1995, however, it was never released for unknown reasons.

Reception

Return to Zork was made on a budget of $1.5 million, and became a commercial hit. In its first six months, the game achieved global sales of 300,000 units. By September 1994, it had earned $2.4 million and sold 600,000 copies—"more than half from bundled systems", according to Fortunes Stephanie Losee. The game shipped roughly 1 million units by October 1995. According to Jeff Sengstack of NewMedia, its success helped to revitalize Activision, which had recently been purchased by Bobby Kotick.

Charles Ardai of Computer Gaming World wrote in a November 1993 preview of Return to Zork that modernizing the Zork series was "treading on sacred ground. It's a little bit like daring to remake Casablanca". The magazine's Scorpia in January 1994 criticized inconsistencies with previous Zork games and other flaws, but stated that "Considered as a game without the Zork label, however, it's not too bad", citing the "pretty" graphics. She suggested that Activision should have published it as a standalone game instead of "trying to recycle the magic of the past", concluding "A new direction is needed here, and if Activision can find it, they may yet produce adventures worthy of the Infocom label". In April 1994 the magazine said that despite some poor acting, the game's "marvelous visual and sound presentation" and "many plot twists and engaging characters will keep most players engrossed".

Return to Zork was named the best adventure game of 1993 by Computer Games Strategy Plus. It was also a runner-up for Computer Gaming Worlds 1993 "Adventure Game of the Year" award, which ultimately went to Gabriel Knight: Sins of the Fathers and Day of the Tentacle (tie). The editors wrote that it uses "Hollywood talent and sophisticated techniques to up the ante of production values." In 1994, PC Gamer US named Return to Zork as the 26th best computer game ever. The editors wrote that it "masterfully ... balances the traditions of a classic gaming series with cutting-edge graphics and CD-ROM technology."

References

External links

Return to Zork at GameFAQs
Return to Zork at Home of the Underdogs
Disaster Labs' satirical review of Return to Zork

1993 video games
Activision games
Cancelled 3DO Interactive Multiplayer games
Cancelled Atari Jaguar games
DOS games
Adventure games
First-person adventure games
Point-and-click adventure games
FM Towns games
Games commercially released with DOSBox
Infocom games
Sega Saturn games
Classic Mac OS games
PC-FX games
PlayStation (console) games
ScummVM-supported games
Zork
Video games developed in the United States